Lisjak is a Croatian and Slovenian surname. It may refer to:
Ivana Lisjak (born 1987), Croatian tennis player
Robert Lisjak, (born 1978), Croatian footballer
Srečko Lisjak, Slovenian general
Vlado Lisjak (born 1962), Croatian wrestler

Croatian surnames